Charles Goodwin may refer to:

Tod Goodwin (Charles R. Goodwin, 1911–1997), American football player
Charles B. Goodwin (1970–present), American judge
Charles Wycliffe Goodwin (1817–1878), British Egyptologist, bible scholar, lawyer and judge
Charles Goodwin (of Rowfant) (1658–1731), English landowner
Charles Goodwin (semiotician) (1943–2018), eminent American linguistic anthropologist and semiotician